Thomas Elderkin (19 July 1909 – 9 December 1961) was an English cricketer who played for Northamptonshire. He was born in Peterborough and died there too.

Elderkin made a single first-class appearance, during the 1934 season, against Sussex at Peterborough. From the middle-order, he scored 13 runs in the first innings and was bowled without scoring in the second innings. Northamptonshire lost the match by an innings and 61 runs.

References

1909 births
1961 deaths
English cricketers
Northamptonshire cricketers
Sportspeople from Peterborough